The Kohima Municipal Council is the local council of Kohima.

It was initially known as Kohima Town Committee (KTC) and had eight wards and four Government nominees. Yusuf Ali was the first Ex-Officio Chairman and Dr. Neilhouzhu Kire was the first Vice-Chairman (1957–1967). In 1982, John Bosco Jasokie was elected as its first chairman. It became a Municipal Council in 2005 with 19 elected councillors.  it is still in a transitional stage without full powers transferred.

References

External links

Kohima Municipal Council Official Website

Kohima
Government of Nagaland